Naal (Urdu ںال; also known as Nall, Nal, Naal) is the largest tehsil of Khuzdar District of Balochistan, Pakistan
Nall is located in Khuzdar District of Balochistan, Kalat Division. It is a real hill station in Khuzdar district. It remains cool in Sun scorching summers of Khuzdar. An ancient archaeological site is located at Nal town in Nall Tehsil. 

An important archaeological site Sohr Damb is located nearby. Prominent personalities of Naal include Mir Ghous Buksh Bizenjo, Mir Hasil Khan Bizenjo, Sardar Muhammad Aslam Bizenjo and Sikander Bizenjo.

References

Populated places in Khuzdar District
Amri-Nal culture